Vasco Da Gama Assembly constituency is one of the 40 (Legislative Assembly) constituencies of Goa state in South India. This constituency came into existence in 1989. It is also the most populated constituency of Goa.

Overview 

Vasco Da Gama (constituency number 25) is one of the 20 Vidhan Sabha constituencies located in South Goa district. This constituency covers the Mormugao (MCL) - Ward Nos. 9 to 17 of Mormugao Saza in Mormugao Taluka. Vasco Da Gama is part of South Goa (Lok Sabha constituency) along with eight other Vidhan Sabha segments covers the entire South Goa district.

Members of Legislative Assembly

Election results

2022 result

2017 Result

2012 Result

See also
 Vasco Da Gama
 South Goa (Lok Sabha constituency)
 List of constituencies of the Goa Legislative Assembly
 South Goa district

References

External link
  

Vasco da Gama, Goa
Assembly constituencies of Goa
South Goa district